Paul Bernard (13 June 1929—1 December 2015) was a French archaeologist, best known for excavating the Hellenistic site of Ai-Khanoum in present-day Afghanistan between 1964 and 1978. In his role as director of excavations, Bernard wrote several treatises on the excavations on the site. He also produced the accounts of Ai-Khanoum that had the most influence on the scholarship on the city: foremost among these was a 1982 article in Scientific American titled 'An Ancient Greek City in Centra Asia', which presented the city as a Hellenistic colony in Central Asia. His emphasis on the Greek traditions of Ai-Khanoum have influenced all subsequent accounts of the Hellenistic Far East.

References

Sources
 
 
 

French archaeologists
Classical archaeologists
Members of the Académie des Inscriptions et Belles-Lettres
20th-century archaeologists
Academic staff of the École pratique des hautes études
2015 deaths
1929 births